Vantanea magdalenensis is a species of plant in the Humiriaceae family. It is endemic to Colombia.

References

Humiriaceae
Endemic flora of Colombia
Endangered plants
Taxonomy articles created by Polbot